The Dillsboro Formation is a geologic formation in Ohio. It preserves fossils dating back to the Ordovician period.

See also

 List of fossiliferous stratigraphic units in Ohio

References

 

Ordovician Indiana
Ordovician Ohio
Ordovician southern paleotemperate deposits